Raymond Avenue is a light rail station along the Metro Green Line in Saint Paul, Minnesota. It is located a block east of the intersection of Raymond Avenue with University Avenue, between Carleton Street and La Salle Street.

Construction in this area began in March 2011.  The station opened along with the rest of the line in 2014.

References

External links
Metro Transit: Raymond Avenue Station

Metro Green Line (Minnesota) stations in Saint Paul, Minnesota
Railway stations in the United States opened in 2014
2014 establishments in Minnesota